Gronau is a town and a municipality in the district of Hildesheim, in Lower Saxony, Germany. It is situated on the river Leine, approx. 15 km southwest of Hildesheim, and 35 km south of Hanover. Since 1 November 2016, the former municipalities Banteln, Betheln, Brüggen, Despetal and Rheden are part of the municipality Gronau.

Gronau is also the seat of the Samtgemeinde ("collective municipality") Leinebergland.

Honiton (UK) is twinned with Gronau.

Personalities 

 Armin Kaufmann (1922-1985), born in Banteln, lawyer and university lecturer
 Jürgen Mlynek (born 1951), physicist

References

External links 

Hildesheim (district)
Members of the Hanseatic League